Hieronymus Bosch (born Jheronimus van Aken ;  – 9 August 1516) was a Dutch/Netherlandish painter from Brabant. He is one of the most notable representatives of the Early Netherlandish painting school. His work, generally oil on oak wood, mainly contains fantastic illustrations of religious concepts and narratives. Within his lifetime his work was collected in the Netherlands, Austria, and Spain, and widely copied, especially his macabre and nightmarish depictions of hell.

Little is known of Bosch's life, though there are some records.  He spent most of it in the town of 's-Hertogenbosch, where he was born in his grandfather's house. The roots of his forefathers are in Nijmegen and Aachen (which is visible in his surname: Van Aken). His pessimistic fantastical style cast a wide influence on northern art of the 16th century, with Pieter Bruegel the Elder being his best-known follower. Today, Bosch is seen as a hugely individualistic painter with deep insight into humanity's desires and deepest fears. Attribution has been especially difficult; today only about 25 paintings are confidently given to his hand along with eight drawings. About another half-dozen paintings are confidently attributed to his workshop. His most acclaimed works consist of a few triptych altarpieces, including The Garden of Earthly Delights.

Life 
Hieronymus Bosch was born Jheronimus (or Joen, respectively the Latin and Middle Dutch form of the name "Jerome") van Aken (meaning "from Aachen"). He signed a number of his paintings as Jheronimus Bosch. His surname derives from his birthplace,  ('Duke's forest'), which is commonly called "Den Bosch" ('the forest').

Little is known of Bosch's life or training. Nothing is known of his personality or his thoughts on the meaning of his art. Bosch's date of birth has not been determined with certainty. The drawing shows the artist at an advanced age, probably in his late sixties.

Bosch lived all his life in and near , which was located in the Duchy of Brabant. His grandfather Jan van Aken (died 1454) was a painter and is first mentioned in the records in 1430. Jan had five sons, four of whom were also painters. Bosch's father, Anthonius van Aken (died  1478), acted as artistic adviser to the Illustrious Brotherhood of Our Blessed Lady. It is generally assumed that either Bosch's father or one of his uncles taught the artist to paint, but none of their works survive. Bosch first appears in the municipal record on 5 April 1474, when he is named along with two brothers and a sister.

's-Hertogenbosch was a flourishing city in 15th-century Brabant, in the south of the present-day Netherlands, at the time part of the Burgundian Netherlands, and during its lifetime passing through marriage to the Habsburgs. In 1463, four thousand houses in the town were destroyed by a catastrophic fire, which the then (approximately) thirteen-year-old Bosch presumably witnessed. He became a popular painter in his lifetime and often received commissions from abroad.

Sometime between 1479 and 1481, Bosch married Aleyt Goyaerts van den Meerveen, who was a few years his senior. The couple moved to the nearby town of Oirschot, where Aleyt Goyaerts van den Meerveen had inherited a house and land from her wealthy family. An entry in the accounts of the Brotherhood of Our Lady records Bosch's death in 1516. A funeral mass served in his memory was held in the church of Saint John on 9 August of that year.

Works 

Bosch produced at least sixteen triptychs: of them, eight survive fully intact with another five surviving in fragments. Bosch's works are generally organised into three periods of his life dealing with the early works (c. 1470–1485), the middle period (c. 1485–1500), and the late period (c. 1500 until his death). According to Stefan Fischer, thirteen of Bosch's surviving paintings were completed in the late period, with seven attributed to his middle period. Bosch's early period is studied in terms of his workshop activity and possibly some of his drawings. Indeed, he taught pupils in the workshop, who were influenced by him. The recent dendrochronological investigation of the oak panels by the scientists at the Bosch Research and Conservation Project led to a more precise dating of the majority of Bosch's paintings.

Bosch sometimes painted in a comparatively sketchy manner, contrasting with the traditional Flemish style of painting in which the smooth surface—achieved by the application of multiple transparent glazes—conceals the brushwork. Bosch's paintings with their rough surfaces, so called impasto painting, differed from the tradition of the great Netherlandish painters of the end of the 15th, and beginning of the 16th centuries, who wished to hide the work done and so suggest their paintings as more nearly divine creations.

Bosch did not date his paintings, but—unusual for the time—he seems to have signed several of them, although some signatures purporting to be his are certainly not. About twenty-five paintings remain today that can be attributed to him. In the late 16th century, Philip II of Spain acquired many of Bosch's paintings. As a result, the Prado Museum in Madrid now owns The Adoration of the Magi, The Garden of Earthly Delights, the tabletop painting of The Seven Deadly Sins and the Four Last Things and The Haywain Triptych.

Painting materials 
Bosch painted his works mostly on oak panels using oil as a medium. Bosch's palette was rather limited and contained the usual pigments of his time. He mostly used azurite for blue skies and distant landscapes, green copper-based glazes and paints consisting of malachite or verdigris for foliage and foreground landscapes, and lead-tin-yellow, ochres and red lake (carmine or madder lake) for his figures.

The Garden of Earthly Delights 

Bosch's most famous triptych is The Garden of Earthly Delights (c. 1495–1505) whose outer panels are intended to bracket the main central panel between the Garden of Eden depicted on the left panel and the Last Judgment depicted on the right panel. It is attributed by Fischer as a transition painting rendered by Bosch from between his middle period and his late period. In the left hand panel God presents Eve to Adam; innovatively God is given a youthful appearance. The figures are set in a landscape populated by exotic animals and unusual semi-organic hut-shaped forms. The central panel is a broad panorama teeming with nude figures engaged in innocent, self-absorbed joy, as well as fantastical compound animals, oversized fruit, and hybrid stone formations.

The right panel presents a hellscape; a world in which humankind has succumbed to the temptations of evil and is reaping eternal damnation. Set at night, the panel features cold colours, tortured figures and frozen waterways. The nakedness of the human figures has lost any eroticism suggested in the central panel, as large explosions in the background throw light through the city gate and spill onto the water in the panel's midground.

Interpretation 

In the 20th century, when changing artistic tastes made artists like Bosch more palatable to the European imagination, it was sometimes argued that Bosch's art was inspired by heretical points of view (e.g., the ideas of the Cathars and/or putative Adamites or Brethren of the Free Spirit) as well as by obscure hermetic practices. Again, since Erasmus had been educated at one of the houses of the Brethren of the Common Life in 's-Hertogenbosch, and the town was religiously progressive, some writers have found it unsurprising that strong parallels exist between the caustic writing of Erasmus and the often bold painting of Bosch.

Others, following a strain of Bosch-interpretation datable already to the 16th century, continued to think his work was created merely to titillate and amuse, much like the "grotteschi" of the Italian Renaissance. While the art of the older masters was based in the physical world of everyday experience, Bosch confronts his viewer with, in the words of the art historian Walter Gibson, "a world of dreams [and] nightmares in which forms seem to flicker and change before our eyes". In one of the first known accounts of Bosch's paintings, in 1560 the Spaniard Felipe de Guevara wrote that Bosch was regarded merely as "the inventor of monsters and chimeras". In the early 17th century, the artist-biographer Karel van Mander described Bosch's work as comprising "wondrous and strange fantasies"; however, he concluded that the paintings are "often less pleasant than gruesome to look at".

In recent decades, scholars have come to view Bosch's vision as less fantastic, and accepted that his art reflects the orthodox religious belief systems of his age. His depictions of sinful humanity and his conceptions of Heaven and Hell are now seen as consistent with those of late medieval didactic literature and sermons. Most writers attach a more profound significance to his paintings than had previously been supposed, and attempt to interpret them in terms of a late medieval morality. It is generally accepted that Bosch's art was created to teach specific moral and spiritual truths in the manner of other Northern Renaissance figures, such as the poet Robert Henryson, and that the images rendered have precise and premeditated significance. According to Dirk Bax, Bosch's paintings often represent visual translations of verbal metaphors and puns drawn from both biblical and folkloric sources. However, the conflict of interpretations that his works still elicit raises profound questions about the nature of "ambiguity" in art of his period.  

Latterly art historians have added a further dimension to the subject of ambiguity in Bosch's work, emphasising ironic tendencies, for example in The Garden of Earthly Delights, both in the central panel (delights), and the right panel (hell). They theorise that the irony offers the option of detachment, both from the real world and from the painted fantasy world, thus appealing to both conservative and progressive viewers.  According to Joseph Koerner, some of the cryptic qualities of the artist's work are due to his special focus on social, political, and spiritual enemies, whose symbolism is, by nature, obscure because it is intended to conceal or to harm. 

A 2012 study on Bosch's paintings alleges that they actually conceal a strong nationalist consciousness, censuring the foreign imperial government of the Burgundian Netherlands, especially Maximilian Habsburg. By systematically superimposing images and concepts, the study asserts that Bosch also made his expiatory self-punishment, for he was accepting well-paid commissions from the Habsburgs and their deputies, and therefore betraying the memory of Charles the Bold.

Debates on attribution 

The exact number of Bosch's surviving works has been a subject of considerable debate. His signature can be seen on only seven of his surviving paintings, and there is uncertainty whether all the paintings once ascribed to him were actually from his hand. It is known that from the early 16th century onwards numerous copies and variations of his paintings began to circulate. In addition, his style was highly influential, and was widely imitated by his numerous followers.

Over the years, scholars have attributed to him fewer and fewer of the works once thought to be his. This is partly a result of technological advances such as infrared reflectography, which enable researchers to examine a painting's underdrawing. Art historians of the early and mid-20th century, such as Tolnay and Baldass, identified between thirty and fifty paintings that they believed to be by Bosch's hand. A later monograph by Gerd Unverfehrt (1980) attributed twenty-five paintings and 14 drawings to him. 

In early 2016, The Temptation of St. Anthony, a small panel in the Nelson-Atkins Museum of Art in Kansas City, Missouri, long attributed to the workshop of Hieronymus Bosch, was credited to the painter himself after intensive forensic study by the Bosch Research and Conservation Project. The BRCP has also questioned whether two well-known paintings traditionally accepted to be by Bosch, The Seven Deadly Sins in the Prado and Christ Carrying the Cross in the Museum of Fine Arts, Ghent should instead be credited to the artist's workshop rather than to the painter's own hand.

See also 
 List of paintings by Hieronymus Bosch
 List of drawings by Hieronymus Bosch

Notes

References

Bibliography 

 Bax, Dirk. Ontcijfering van Jeroen Bosch. Den Haag: Staats-drukkerij-en Uitgeverijbedrijf, 1949.
 Boulboullé, Guido. "Groteske Angst. Die Höllenphantasien des Hieronymus Bosch". In: Auffarth, Christoph and Kerth, Sonja (Eds): Glaubensstreit und Gelächter: Reformation und Lachkultur im Mittelalter und in der Frühen Neuzeit. Berlin: LIT Verlag, 2008. 55–78.
 Dijck, Godfried Christiaan Maria van. Op zoek naar Jheronimus van Aken alias Bosch. De feiten. Familie, vrienden en opdrachtgevers. Zaltbommel: Europese Bibliotheek, 2001. 
 Fischer, Stefan. Hieronymus Bosch. The Complete Works. Köln: Taschen, 2016 
 Fraenger, Wilhelm. Hieronymus Bosch. Dresden: Verlag der Kunst, 1975.
 Le royaume millénaire de Jérôme Bosch (French transl. by Roger Lewinter, Paris: Ivrea, 1993).
 Gibson, Walter. Hieronymus Bosch. New York: Thames and Hudson, 1973. 
 Jacobs, Lynn. "The Triptychs of Hieronymus Bosch". The Sixteenth Century Journal, Volume 31, No. 4, 2000. 1009–1041
 Koerner, Joseph Leo. Bosch and Bruegel: From Enemy Painting to Everyday Life. Princeton University Press, 2016. 
 Koldeweij, Jos & Vermet, Bernard  & van Kooij, Barbera. Hieronymus Bosch.  New Insights Into His Life and Work. Rotterdam: NAi Publishers, 2001. 
 Malizia, Enrico. Hieronymus Bosch. Insigne pittore nel crepuscolo del medio evo. Stregoneria, magia, alchimia, simbolismo. Roma: Youcanprint Ed., 2015. 
 Marijnissen, Roger. Hiëronymus Bosch. Het volledige oeuvre. Haarlem: Gottmer/Brecht, 1987. 
 Pokorny, Erwin. "Hieronymus Bosch und das Paradies der Wollust". In: Frühneuzeit-Info, Jg. 21, Heft 1+2 ("Sonderband: Die Sieben Todsünden in der Frühen Neuzeit"), 2010. 22–34.
 Strickland, Debra Higgs. The Epiphany of Hieronymys Bosch. Imagining Antichrist and Others from the Middle Ages to the Reformation (Studies in Medieval and Early Renaissance Art History), Turnhout: Harvey Miller, 2016,

Further reading

External links 

 Jheronimus Bosch Art Center
 Hieronymus Bosch at Ibiblio
 "Hieronymus Bosch, Tempter and Moralist" Analysis by Larry Silver.
 Hieronymus BoschThe complete works, 188 works by Bosch
 Bosch Research and Conservation Project (BRCP)
 Hieronymus Bosch, General Resources, ColourLex
 Bosch, the Fifth Centenary Exhibition: At the Prado
 Works at Open Library
K. Katelyn Hobbs, "Ecce Homo by a follower of Hieronymus Bosch (cat. 352)" in The John G. Johnson Collection: A History and Selected Works, a Philadelphia Museum of Art free digital publication.
 

 
1450s births
1516 deaths
Christian artists
Early Netherlandish painters
16th-century Dutch painters
Mythological painters
People from 's-Hertogenbosch
Renaissance painters
Dutch Roman Catholics
Dutch caricaturists
Dutch draughtsmen
Dutch erotic artists
Dutch surrealist artists
Catholic painters